Vittorio De Angelis (September 20, 1962 – June 11, 2015) was an Italian voice actor.

Biography
Born in Rome, De Angelis was the son of voice actor Manlio De Angelis and the grandson of voice actor Gualtiero De Angelis. He began his voice acting career at 21 years of age and one of his first major roles was dubbing the voice of Prince Eric in the Italian dub of The Little Mermaid and I.M. Weasel in the Italian dub of I Am Weasel. He was also best known for voicing Joey Tribbiani (portrayed by Matt LeBlanc) in the Italian-Language dubbed version of Friends and the spin-off Joey as well as voicing Geordi La Forge (portrayed by LeVar Burton) in the Italian-Language dubbed version of Star Trek: The Next Generation.

De Angelis was the official voice actor of Cary Elwes, Kevin James and Matt LeBlanc. Some of the actors he dubbed in certain films included Billy Crudup in Big Fish, Val Kilmer in Tombstone and Stephen Dorff in Blade. He also dubbed Steve Zahn, Casey Affleck, Jason Segel and Ethan Hawke in some of their films.

Death
De Angelis died of a heart attack on June 11, 2015 at the age of 52. He was survived by his father Manlio De Angelis as well as his sister Eleonora De Angelis (who is also a voice actress).

Dubbing roles

Animation

Live action

References

External links
 
 
 

1962 births
2015 deaths
Male actors from Rome
Italian male voice actors
Italian voice directors
20th-century Italian male actors
21st-century Italian male actors